Achuvoldrach (Scottish Gaelic: Achadh a’ Mholltairich) is a small remote village on the west shore of the Kyle of Tongue in Sutherland, in the Highland region of Scotland. Achuvoldrach is linked to the village of Tongue by the Kyle of Tongue Causeway across the sea loch, on a west to east orientation.

Settlements

Geography

References

Populated places in Sutherland